Bottoms Up is a 2006 American romantic comedy film starring Jason Mewes and Paris Hilton. The film was directed by Erik MacArthur who is also one of the co-authors of the screenplay.

Plot
Owen Peadman is a Minnesota bartender who arrives in Los Angeles to try to help his father raise money to save his small restaurant. Owen moves in with his gay uncle, Earl, and tries to integrate himself into the high society of Hollywood, where he has a chance run-in with a wealthy socialite named Lisa Mancini and her uptight actor boyfriend Hayden Field. Owen, using a little influence and blackmail, gets a taste of the scandalous lifestyles of the Hollywood upper crust while dealing with his growing romantic feelings for Lisa.

Cast
Jason Mewes as Owen Peadman
David Keith as Uncle Earl Peadman
Paris Hilton as Lisa Mancini
Brian Hallisay as Hayden Field
Jon Abrahams as Jimmy DeSnappio
Phil Morris as Pip Wingo
Nicholle Tom as Penny Dhue
Raymond O'Connor as Frank Peadman
Desmond Harrington as Rusty #1
Kevin Smith as Rusty #2
Nic Nac as Nick
Lindsay Gareth as Dorothy
Tim Thomerson as A.J. Mancini
Dominic Daniel as Boots
Benjamin Anderson as Erik
Johnny Messner as Limo Driver

Release
The film was released straight-to-DVD on September 12, 2006.

References

External links

2006 romantic comedy films
2006 direct-to-video films
American LGBT-related films
American romantic comedy films
American direct-to-video films
Films set in Los Angeles
Sony Pictures direct-to-video films
2000s English-language films
2000s American films
LGBT-related romantic comedy films